OAO Konditerskiy Kontsern Babayevskiy Open Joint-Stock Company is the oldest Russian confectionery manufacturer and a member of United Confectioners holding company. It is located in Moscow (Malaya Krasnoselskaya St., 7).

History 
The factory conducts history since 1804 as a family workshop of the confectioners Abrikosovy. In 1918 it was nationalized. Its current name was received only in 1922 in honor of Peter Akimovich Babayev, chairman of the Sokolniki District Executive Committee. In 1993 it was privatized. In 2002, after the bankruptcy of Inkombank, the controlling interest in the concern was sold to the Amidis LLC for 800 million rubles.

It is named after the Soviet revolutionary of Azerbaijani descent Pyotr (Peter) Babayev.

See also
 Food industry of Russia

References

United Confectioners
Food and drink companies of the Soviet Union
Manufacturing companies based in Moscow
Manufacturing companies established in 1804
Brand name chocolate
Russian brands
Companies nationalised by the Soviet Union